Darkbloom may refer to:
 Darkbloom (album), a 2022 album by We Came as Romans
 Darkbloom (EP), a 2011 EP by Grimes and d'Eon